The Ambassador of Malaysia to the Republic of the Sudan is the head of Malaysia's diplomatic mission to Sudan. The position has the rank and status of an Ambassador Extraordinary and Plenipotentiary and is based in the Embassy of Malaysia, Khartoum.

List of heads of mission

Chargé d'affaires to Sudan

Ambassadors to Sudan

See also
 Malaysia–Sudan relations

References 

 
Sudan
Malaysia